Fresh  or FRESH may refer to:

Arts, entertainment, and media

Films and television
Fresh (1994 film), a crime film
Fresh (2009 film), a documentary film on sustainable agriculture
Fresh (2022 film), a thriller film
Fresh with the Australian Women's Weekly (or simply Fresh), an Australian cooking show

Music

Groups and labels
Fresh (band), a London-based pop-punk band
Fresh Records (UK)
Fresh Records (US)

Albums
Fresh (Shawn Desman album)
Fresh!, Gina G album
Fresh (Raspberries album)
Fresh (Sly and the Family Stone album)
Fresh (Teddybears album)
Fresh (Melissa Tkautz album)
Fresh, a 2010 album by Tye Tribbett

Songs
"Fresh" (Daft Punk song)
"Fresh" (Devo song)
"Fresh!" (Gina G song)
"Fresh" (Kool & the Gang song), a 1984 song by Kool & The Gang
"F.R.E.S.H.", a 2007 song by Scribe
"Fresh", a 1996 song by Daft Punk from Homework

Radio
Fresh (Coventry & Warwickshire), an English radio station, covering the West Midlands
Fresh 40, a networked music singles chart show broadcast in the UK
Fresh 92.7, an Adelaide radio station formerly known as Fresh FM
Fresh Air (Edinburgh), an alternative music radio station
Fresh FM (Netherlands), a Dutch music radio station
Fresh FM (Nigeria), a radio network in Nigeria
Fresh FM (New Zealand), a community access station
Fresh FM (Petroc), a student-led radio station at Petroc in Barnstaple, England
Fresh Radio (Canada), adult contemporary brand used by several stations in Alberta, Manitoba, and Southern Ontario
Fresh Radio, a defunct British radio station
WCFS-FM, a radio station in Elmwood Park, Illinois formerly branded as Fresh FM
WIAD a radio station in Bethesda, Maryland formerly branded as Fresh FM
WNEW-FM, a station in New York City formerly branded as Fresh FM

People
DJ Fresh (born 1977), UK-based drum and bass artist
DJ Fresh (producer), US-based R&B producer born Marqus Brown

Other uses
Fresh (IDE), an integrated development environment for flat assembler languages
 Fresh (wine), a positive perception of wine acidity

See also
Fresh air (disambiguation)
Fresh Meadows (disambiguation)
Fresh Pond (disambiguation)
Fresh Prince (disambiguation)
Fresh River (disambiguation)
Fresh Start (disambiguation)